The lieutenant governor of Wisconsin is the first person in the line of succession of Wisconsin's executive branch, thus serving as governor in the event of the death, resignation, removal, impeachment, absence from the state, or incapacity due to illness of the governor of Wisconsin. 
Forty-one individuals have held the office of lieutenant governor since Wisconsin's admission to the Union in 1848, two of whom—Warren Knowles and Jack Olson—have served for non-consecutive terms.  The first lieutenant governor was John Holmes, who took office on June 7, 1848.  The current lieutenant governor is Sara Rodriguez, who took office on January 3, 2023.

Succession to the governorship 
Until 1979, the Wisconsin Constitution merely stated that in the event of the governor's death, resignation, removal from office, impeachment, absence from the state or incapacity due to illness, "the powers and duties of the office [of Governor of Wisconsin] shall devolve upon the lieutenant governor". Lieutenant governors who served as governor during this period are referred to as "acting governors". In 1979, the constitution was amended to make this more specific: in the event of the governor's death, resignation, or removal from office, the lieutenant governor becomes governor; in the event of the governor's impeachment, absence, or incapacity, the lieutenant governor becomes acting governor until the governor is again able to serve.

Lieutenant gubernatorial elections and term of office 
Under the original terms of the state constitution, the lieutenant governor was elected for a two-year term on a separate ticket from the governor; because of this, the governor and lieutenant governor of Wisconsin have not always been of the same party.  After a 1967 amendment, however, the two have been nominated, and voted upon, as a single ticket.  The 1967 amendment also increased the terms of both the governor and lieutenant governor to four years.  There is no limit to the number of terms a lieutenant governor may hold.

Vacancy 
The original constitution made no provision for a vacancy in the office of the lieutenant governor; in the event of the lieutenant governor's death, resignation, or service as acting governor, the lieutenant governorship usually remained vacant until the end of the term. In 1938, following the resignation of lieutenant governor Henry Gunderson, Governor Philip La Follette appointed Herman Ekern lieutenant governor to fill the vacancy. This appointment was challenged in court, and ruled valid in the case State ex rel. Martin v. Ekern. In 1979 the constitution was amended to explicitly allow this: in the event of a vacancy in the office of the lieutenant governor, the governor nominates a candidate who becomes lieutenant governor for the remainder of the term upon his approval by the Wisconsin Assembly and Wisconsin State Senate.

Removal 
A lieutenant governor may be removed from office through an impeachment trial or a recall. They may also choose to resign from office.  No lieutenant governor has ever been impeached; two have resigned. Rebecca Kleefisch is the only lieutenant governor in the history of any state to face recall election in 2012. She faced Democrat Mahlon Mitchell and won the election with a six percent majority.

Lieutenant gubernatorial powers 
If the governor appoints the lieutenant governor to a statutory board, committee or commission on which he is entitled membership as his representative, the lieutenant governor has all the authority in that position that would be granted the governor.

Originally, the lieutenant governor also presided over the state senate and cast a vote in the event of a tie; however, after an amendment to the Wisconsin Constitution in 1979, the senate chooses a senator to be presiding officer.

List of lieutenant governors 

From 1836, until 1848, what is now Wisconsin was part of Wisconsin Territory.  There was no position of "Territorial Lieutenant Governor"; however, the territory had a Secretary who was similar in that one of his functions was to assume the powers and duties of the territorial governor if he were unable to carry them out.  For the secretaries from the territorial period, see the List of Secretaries of Wisconsin Territory.

Wisconsin was admitted to the Union on May 29, 1848.  Since then, it has had 41 lieutenant governors, two of whom have served non-consecutive terms.

Parties

Notes

References 
General

Specific

External links 
Office of the Lieutenant Governor

 
Wisconsin